The Imperial Automobile Company of Jackson, Michigan, was formed by the brothers T. A. and George N. Campbell in 1908, who also ran the Jackson Carriage Company.

History

Imperial produced mid-size cars with four-cylinder engines; the bodywork and mechanicals were primarily off-the-shelf rather than bespoke.  Coachwork was done out-of-house by Beaudette Company, which also did work for Buick and Ford.  In 1912 the Imperial factory burned down and the company moved into the old Buick truck plant.  In 1914 a six-cylinder engine was introduced. Car production lasted until 1916.

In 1915, Imperial merged with Marion from Indianapolis, Indiana to form Mutual Motors Company.  Under this new name, they stopped production of Imperials the following year. The new cars produced in Jackson were called Marion-Handley instead.

See also
 Brass Era car
 List of defunct United States automobile manufacturers

References

Conceptcarz: 1910 Imperial Model 35

Defunct motor vehicle manufacturers of the United States
Motor vehicle manufacturers based in Michigan
Brass Era vehicles
Jackson, Michigan
Vehicle manufacturing companies established in 1908
Vehicle manufacturing companies disestablished in 1916
1908 establishments in Michigan
1916 disestablishments in Michigan
1900s cars
1910s cars
Cars introduced in 1908